Dopravný podnik Bratislava, akciová spoločnosť (literally Public Transport Company Bratislava, inc., abbr. DPB a.s.) is the only provider of city public transport in Bratislava. It provides 3 types of transportation:
 trams (streetcars) 230 vehicles
 buses 464 vehicles
 trolleybuses 123 vehicles

The 100% owner of the company is the city of Bratislava.

Vehicles 
DPB provides public transport using these vehicles:

Trams:
 Tatra-ČKD T3 113 vehicles (110 vehicles have digital/electronic destination sign installation and acoustic information system)
 Tatra-ČKD T3 4 vehicles are reconstructed to T3MOD (1 vehicle), T3AS (1 vehicle), T3S (2 vehicles)
 Tatra-ČKD T3P 20 vehicles
 Tatra-ČKD K2 3 historic vehicles
 Tatra-ČKD K2S 36 vehicles
 Tatra-ČKD K2G 1 vehicle (reconstructed in 1998–2005)
 Tatra-ČKD T6A5 58 vehicles (2 prototype trams delivered in 2006)
 Škoda 29 T and Škoda 30 T, 30 vehicles each.

Buses:
 Ikarus 280 1 historic vehicle (all vehicles are reject)
 Karosa B 732 30 vehicles and 2 historic vehicles (48 vehicles are reconstructed to Karosa B732 NSTG)
 Ikarus 283 1 vehicle and 2 historic vehicles (the others vehicles are reject)
 Karosa B 741 91 vehicles (86 vehicles are reconstructed to Karosa B741 NSTG)
 TAM 260 A 180 M 1 historic vehicle
 TAM 272 A 180 M 6 vehicles and 1 historic vehicle (all vehicles are reconstructed)
 TAM 232 A 116 M 4 vehicles (all vehicles are reconstructed, one vehicle is reject)
 Ikarus 435 85 vehicles (3 vehicles are reconstructed)
 Ikarus 415 35 vehicles (1 vehicle was reconstructed abortion in years 2004–2005 to Ikarus 415 CNG)
 Ikarus 412 3 vehicles with low-floor (1 vehicle is specially using for handicapped children)
 SOR B 9.5 32 vehicles
 SOR BN 9.5 18 vehicles with low-floor
 Mercedes-Benz Sprinter 416 CDI 2 minibuses with low-floor
Solaris Urbino 15 CNG 22 vehicles with low-floor
 Iveco Daily Way 8 minibuses with low-floor
 SOR C 10.5 8 vehicles
 Tedom C12 G 30 vehicles (lease by Tedom from January 2009 to January 2017)
 SOR BN 10.5 38 vehicles with low-floor
Mercedes-Benz O 530 Citaro CNG 1 vehicle
Mercedes-Benz O 530 GL CapaCity 41 vehicles
Mercedes-Benz O 405 GN2 11 vehicles with low-floor (lease by Abuss s.r.o. Nitra from November 2009)
 SOR NB 18 City 182 vehicles
Irisbus Citelis 12M 35 vehicles
Iveco Urbanway 12M 40 vehicles
Solaris Urbino 10 10 vehicles
SOR NB 12 City 28 vehicles
Solaris Urbino 8,6 6 vehicles
SOR EBN 8 2 vehicles
SOR NS 12 Electric 16 vehicles
MAN NG 313 5 vehicles (all vehicles are from Klagenfurt)
Solaris Urbino 18 6 vehicles (all vehicles are from Berlin BVG)
Solaris New Urbino 18 12 vehicles
Rošero First FCLEI 4 vehicles
Otokar Kent C 18,75 71 vehicles
SOR NS 12 Diesel 80 vehicles
Solaris Urbino 12 Hydrogen 4 vehicles

Trolleybuses:
 Škoda 14Tr 65 vehicles (21 vehicles are reconstructed)
Škoda 14TrM 12 vehicles
 Škoda 15Tr 16 vehicles (all vehicles are reconstructed)
Škoda 15TrM 23 vehicles
 Škoda 21Tr 1 vehicle with low-floor
 Škoda 25Tr 6 vehicles with diesel-electric agregat with low-floor
Škoda 30Tr 35 vehicles with low-floor and 15 vehicles with diesel-electric agregat with low-floor
Škoda 31Tr 70 vehicles with low-floor
Škoda-Solaris 24m 16 vehicles with battery with low-floor
Škoda 27Tr 23 vehicles with battery with low-floor
SOR TNS 12 11 vehicles with battery with low-floor

Aggregate 
1 January 2009 Public Transport Company Bratislava have 880 carry on vehicles.

Directors 
 1895–1907 – Karol Kakulay
 1907–1920 – Rudolf Pleskott
 1920–1939 – Ing. Jaroslav Bartošek
 1939–1943 – Ing. Štefan Januš
 1943–1949 – Dr. Vladimír Brežný
 1949–1950 – Ján Bauman
 1950–1951 – Ján Mazáček
 1951–1954 – Martin Hanzlík
 1954–1960 – Jozef Zatlkaj
 1960–1970 – Ladislav Studenič
 1970–1972 – František Mariš
 1972–1987 – Ing. Ladislav Moštenan
 1986–1990 – Ing. Ján Novotný
 1990–1992 – dpt. Jozef Hlavina
 1992–1994 – JUDr. Ivan Letaši
 1994–1995 – Ing. Peter Forgáč
 1995–1997 – Ing. Peter Klučka
 1997–2007 – Ing. Ján Zachar
 2007–2009 – Róbert Kadnár
 2009–2011 – Ing. Pavel Derkay
 2011–2015 – Ing. Ľubomír Belfi
 2015–2019 – Ing. Milan Urban
2019–present – Ing. Martin Rybanský

Former names of DPB 
Over the course of the past century Public Transport Company Bratislava has had about 14 names.
 BEÚS – Bratislavská elektrická účastinná spoločnosť
 BKH – Elektrická lokálna železnica Bratislava- krajinská hranica
 BMEŽ – Bratislavská mestská elektrická železnica
 DOZAB – Dopravné závody hl. m. Bratislavy, komunálny podnik
 DPMB – Dopravný podnik mesta Bratislava
 DPHMB koncern – Dopravné podniky hl. m. SSR Bratislavy – koncern
 DZHMB – Dopravné závody hl. m. SSR Bratislavy, koncernový podnik
 DPB, š.p. – Dopravný podnik Bratislava, štátny podnik
 POHéV – Pozsony Országhatárszeli Helyiérdekú Villamos Vasút
 PVVV – Pozsonyi Város Villamos Vasút
 LWP – Lokalbahn Wien – (Pozsony) Pressburg (Pressburgerbahn)
 NOLB – Niederosterreichische Landdesbahnen – Dolnorakúske krajinské železnice
 DPB – Dopravný podnik Bratislava, štátny podnik
 DPB – Dopravný podnik Bratislava, akciová spoločnosť (today)

Gallery

External links
 Official website
 Unofficial, but more complex website about public transport in Bratislava
 Basic information about public transport in Bratislava in English
 Bratislava vehicles descriptions

Transport in Bratislava
Public transport operators